James Roland Dexter (born March 3, 1973) is a former professional American football player who played offensive tackle for five seasons for the Arizona Cardinals and Carolina Panthers. Born to Richard P. Dexter.

References

1973 births
Living people
People from Fort Ord, California
Players of American football from California
American football offensive tackles
American football offensive guards
South Carolina Gamecocks football players
Arizona Cardinals players
Carolina Panthers players